An annular solar eclipse occurred on August 21, 1933. A solar eclipse occurs when the Moon passes between Earth and the Sun, thereby totally or partly obscuring the image of the Sun for a viewer on Earth. An annular solar eclipse occurs when the Moon's apparent diameter is smaller than the Sun's, blocking most of the Sun's light and causing the Sun to look like an annulus (ring). An annular eclipse appears as a partial eclipse over a region of the Earth thousands of kilometres wide. Annularity was visible from Italian Libya (today's Libya), Egypt, Mandatory Palestine (today's Israel, Palestine and Jordan) including Jerusalem and Amman, French Mandate for Syria and the Lebanon (the part now belonging to Syria), Iraq including Baghdad, Persia, Afghanistan, British Raj (the parts now belonging to Pakistan, India, Bangladesh and Myanmar), Siam (name changed to Thailand later), Dutch East Indies (today's Indonesia), North Borneo (now belonging to Malaysia), and Australia.

Related eclipses

Solar eclipses 1931–1935

Saros 134

Inex series

Notes

References 

1933 8 21
1933 8 21
1933 in science
August 1933 events